Sphagneticola trilobata, commonly known as the Bay Biscayne creeping-oxeye, Singapore daisy, creeping-oxeye, trailing daisy, and wedelia, is a plant in the tribe Heliantheae tribe of the family Asteraceae. It is native to Mexico, Central America, and the Caribbean, but now grows throughout the Neotropics. It is widely cultivated as an ornamental groundcover.

Description
Spreading, mat-forming perennial herb up to 30 cm in height. Has rounded stems up to 40 cm long, rooting at nodes and with the flowering stems ascending. Leaves are fleshy, hairy, 4–9 cm long and 2–5 cm wide, serrate or irregularly toothed, normally with pairs of lateral lobes, and dark green above and lighter green below.  Peduncles are 3–10 cm long; involucres are campanulate to hemispherical, about 1 cm high; chaffy bracts are lanceolate, rigid. The flowers are bright yellow ray florets of about 8-13 per head, rays are 6–15 mm long; disk-corollas 4–5 mm long. The pappus is a crown of short fimbriate scales.  The seeds are tuberculate achenes, 4–5 mm long. Propagation is mostly vegetatively as seeds are usually not fertile.

Habitat
It has a very wide ecological tolerance range, but grows best in sunny areas with well-drained, moist soil at low elevations.

Invasive species
Sphagneticola trilobata is listed in the IUCN's “List of the world's 100 worst invasive species”. It is spread by people as an ornamental or groundcover that is planted in gardens, and then it is spread into surrounding areas by dumping of garden waste. It spreads vegetatively, not by seed. It rapidly forms a dense ground cover, crowding away and preventing other plant species from regenerating. This species is widely available as an ornamental and is therefore likely to spread further.

It is a noxious weed in agricultural land, along roadsides urban waste places and other disturbed sites. It is also invasive along streams, canals, along the borders of mangrove swamps and in coastal vegetation.

It is widespread as an invasive species on the Pacific Islands, Hong Kong, South Africa, Australia, Indonesia, and Sri Lanka.

Gallery

References

External links
 Plants.usda.gov
 Hear.org
 Austrop.org.au

Heliantheae
Flora of Central America
Flora of the Caribbean
Flora of northern South America
Flora of Bolivia
Flora of Brazil
Flora of Colombia
Flora of Ecuador
Flora of Peru
Flora of Mexico
Invasive plant species in Sri Lanka
Invasive plant species in Japan
Flora without expected TNC conservation status